Jaggampeta is a town in Jaggampeta mandal, located in Kakinada district of the Indian state of Andhra Pradesh. It is located on the banks of river Godavari. A town in which worked under British rule since 17th century, Primarily known as an exporter of Tiles to london from India, and today it still shines between the old and tallest pipeholes that used in the creation of tiles. This town also had primary role in the Andhra Pradesh politics. This city also named as "Uddandula kota", "The gate of Agency", "The Entrance of Maredumilli forests" and "The Center of East Godavari".

Geography
It has an average elevation of 44 meters (148 feet)

Governance

The civic body of Jaggampeta is going to be upgraded as municipal council..

Transportation

Jaggampeta is located on NH 16. The nearest railway station to Jaggampeta is Samalkot railway station which is 20km away. The nearest airport to Jaggampeta is Rajahmundry Airport which 35km is away.

Famous Persons
Ravi Teja

References 

Villages in Jaggampeta mandal